Yan Shigu (581–645), formal name Yan Zhou, but went by the courtesy name of Shigu, was a famous Chinese historian, linguist, politician, and writer of the Tang Dynasty.

Biography
Yan was born in Wannian (in modern Xi'an, Shaanxi). His ancestors were originally from Langya (in modern Linyi, Shandong). Yan's grandfather Yan Zhitui was an official under the Northern Qi. After the fall of Northern Qi, Zhitui became an official of the Northern Zhou, and moved his family to Guanzhong. His son Yan Silu, Yan's father, was also an official, and served in the residence of Li Shimin.

Yan was well-read during his youth and was familiar with philology. Recommended by Li Gang, he was given a post at Anyang county (now Xiangyang, Hubei) during the reign of Emperor Wen of Sui. One of his father's old friends, Xue Daoheng, was impressed by Yan's talent, and often asked for his comments on his new works. For some reason, Yan Shigu was later dismissed, and took up residence at Chang'an. During the next ten years he lived in poverty and taught for a living. He was later granted several important official posts during the Tang dynasty. Yan was promoted when Li Shimin  ascended the throne, but resumed his duty after his mother's funeral.

After years of struggle, Yan was then demoted, but was subsequently ordered to revise the Five Classics in the library. He wrote commentaries on several Chinese classic texts such as the Shiji and Hanshu. According to New Book of Tang, he died on the road during an expedition to Goguryeo in 645.

Ancestors and descendants
Yan Zhitui's father was Yan Xie (颜协; 498 - 539). Yan Xie's father was Yan Jianyuan.

Yan Yuansun (顏元孫, the author of Ganlu Zishu) was Yan Shigu's descendant.

References 

 Old Book of Tang, vol. 73 
 New Book of Tang, vol. 198

External links
 Author List for Yan Shigu at The Ricca Institute Library
 

581 births
645 deaths
Chinese Confucianists
Historians from Shaanxi
Linguists from China
Medieval linguists
Politicians from Xi'an
Tang dynasty historians
Writers from Xi'an
Chinese classicists